Charles Grove was a cricketer.

Charles Grove may also refer to:

Charles Clayton Grove, mathematician
Charles Grove, of the Grove baronets
Charles Jake Grove (born 1980)

See also
Charles Groves (1915–1992), English conductor